Zwota is a village and a former municipality in the Vogtlandkreis district, in Saxony, Germany. Since 1 January 2013, it is part of the town Klingenthal.

References 

Former municipalities in Saxony
Klingenthal